Did You Know Gaming? (abbreviated DYKG) is a video game–focused blog and web series which launched in May 2012. The site features video content focusing on video game related trivia and facts, with occasional journalistic investigations into gaming's lost secrets and forgotten products. Each video is narrated by a number of popular internet personalities and industry professionals including Jon Jafari of JonTron, Arin Hanson, Smooth McGroove,  David Hayter and more.

Since the website's launch, it has been featured on numerous major news and gaming outlets including Huffington Post, MCV, Game Informer, MTV, Nerdist, and the Houston Press.

In 2017, Did You Know Gaming? opened a second channel, called DYKG Clips (formerly Did You Know Gaming? 2).

History
The site launched on May 14, 2012, by Shane Gill who came up with the idea for a trivia focused website based on gaming after being inspired by a number of Facebook trivia groups. By July 2012, the official Facebook page had reached nearly 20,000 fans in under eight weeks. As of January 2022, the official YouTube channel has currently over 2,300,000 subscribers and over 580 million views.

On January 25, 2014, Did You Know Gaming partnered with a relaunched Normal Boots, a collaborative website for hosting gaming themed content created by Jon Jafari and Austin Hargrave. A spin-off series' has also been created on the channel "The Film Theorists" called Did You Know Movies. It has long since moved to the NormalBoots YouTube channel in where the majority of the original videos were reworked.

On July 7, 2017, Did You Know Gaming? announced a new channel, featuring content created by Dazz, creator of The VG Resource websites and the Region Locked series, alongside Greg who also works on Region Locked. The channel features a more off-the-cuff style primarily focused around providing additional content to complement the main channel. The channel hosted its own version of two of the channels main shows, "Did You Know Gaming? Extra" and "Region Locked Light". As of April 2021, the second channel has over 160,000 subscribers and more than 4.1 million views.

On November 21, 2017, they announced that Region Locked Light would be cancelled and that Did You Know Gaming? Extra would be moved to the main channel. They, as of the date, had almost no plans for the channel. One of their ideas was using the channel to promote smaller trivia and gaming channels.

On June 29, 2020, they announced Did You Know Gaming? 2 would be rebranded as DYKG Clips which compiles clips from Did You Know Gaming? and Did You Know Gaming extra.

On April 23, 2022, they announced they would release the one-hour videos from DYKG Clips as podcasts.

Content
The site releases videos presenting trivia based on different franchises. Series which have been covered are Star Fox, Pikmin, Super Smash Bros. Metroid and many more. One specific series called Easter Egg Hunting looks at secrets and Easter Eggs found in games based on a particular show or in a specific game such as South Park, Doctor Who and Metal Gear Solid.

VGFacts
VGFacts is a sister website of Did You Know Gaming? which launched in March 2013 and also features gaming related trivia. Created in partnership with The Spriters Resource, the site features trivia covering thousands of games, series and consoles as well as articles discussing various topics, which even includes contributions from game publisher Konami.

Episode list
Each episode covers a specific franchise or game and is often narrated by a popular internet personality. There is the main Did You Know Gaming? series and other spin-offs such as VGFacts and Region Locked.

Did You Know Gaming?

Did You Know Gaming? Extra 
Did You Know Gaming? Extra (first on their second channel) usually talks about a specific theme (such as censorship or love in video games) and a random piece of trivia in the end. On November 21, 2017, they announced that the series was moving to their main channel.
{| class="wikitable"
!No.
!Title
!Narrator
!Date
|-
!1
|Final Fantasy 8 Was Translated Using GameShark
|Dazz
|July 7, 2017
|-
!2
|Nintendo Switch's Easter Egg to Japanese Meme
|Greg
|July 7, 2017
|-
!3
|Rick and Morty Games are Canon?
|Greg
|July 7, 2017
|-
!4
|Minecraft Updated to Save Pet Birds
|Dazz
|July 11, 2017
|-
!5
|Game Disc Jokingly Insults Gamers
|Greg
|July 13, 2017
|-
!6
|Why George R. R. Martin Won't Play Game of Thrones Games
|Dazz
|July 18, 2017
|-
!7
|Mario Kart 8's Offensive Gesture Censored
|Greg
|July 20, 2017
|-
!8
|Metroid Easter Egg in Virtual Boy Game
|Dazz
|July 25, 2017
|-
!9
|Rayman Was a 10-Year-Old Boy Named Jimmy?
|Greg
|July 27, 2017
|-
!10
|Spider-Man Easter Egg Censors Profanity
|Dazz
|August 1, 2017
|-
!11
|The UK's 'Hit' Sonic the Hedgehog Song
|Dazz
|August 3, 2017
|-
!12
|Parents Named Their Child After Skyrim
|Greg
|August 8, 2017
|-
!13
|Diddy Kong Racing's Failed Gamecube Sequel
|Greg
|August 10, 2017
|-
!14
|The Man Who Married His Waifu
|Dazz
|August 15, 2017
|-
!15
|Sonic's First Game Wasn't His Own
|Greg
|August 18, 2017
|-
!16
|Tony Hawk Edited Videos for Hudson's Turbografx
|Dazz
|August 22, 2017
|-
!17
|Rare Wanted amiibo on Nintendo 64 (N64)
|Dazz
|August 24, 2017
|-
!18
|Hidden Love Letter in Simpsons Game
|Greg
|August 30, 2017
|-
!19
|Nintendo's Women-Only Arcade Game
|Dazz
|September 1, 2017
|-
!20
|Japanese McDonald's PlayStation 2 Games (PS2)
|Greg
|September 5, 2017
|-
!21
|Snake Was Almost Voiced By Kurt Russell?
|Greg
|September 7, 2017
|-
!22
|Jack Black's First Acting Gig In Pitfall Commercial
|Dazz
|September 12, 2017
|-
!23
|Nintendo's Gaming Phone Patent
|Greg
|September 14, 2017
|-
!24
|Kirby's Creator [Masahiro] Sakurai Was Only 19 Years Old [When Kirby's Dream Land came out]
|Dazz
|September 21, 2017
|-
!25
|Sonic the Hedgehog's Credits Easter Egg
|Greg
|September 24, 2017
|-
!26
|Super 3D Noah's Ark Was A Horror Game
|Dazz
|September 27, 2017
|-
!27
|Pokémon Ruby & Sapphire's Developer Easter Egg
|Dazz
|October 3, 2017
|-
!28
|Dragon's Lair's Playboy Inspiration
|Greg
|October 8, 2017
|-
!29
|The Cancelled Monkey Island Movie
|Greg
|October 12, 2017
|-
!30
|Super Smash Bros Wii U Censored in Japan
|Dazz
|October 15, 2017
|-
!31
|Woman Found Gaming After Being Missing 10 Years
|Greg
|October 18, 2017
|-
!32
|The Origin Of The Cutscene
|Dazz
|October 20, 2017
|-
!33
|Nintendo is Run Like a School?
|Greg
|October 24, 2017
|-
!34
|Nier: Automata's Political Influences
|Dazz
|October 26, 2017
|-
!35
|Woman Held Hostage With Sega Light Gun
|Ashens
|October 31, 2017
|-
!36
|Who the Doom Guy is
|Greg
|November 5, 2017
|-
!37
|Super Mario Odyssey's Mario 64 Easter Egg
|Dazz
|November 7, 2017
|-
!38
|Unfortunately Titled Games
|Dazz
|November 10, 2017
|-
!39
|Sonic's Lost Educational Game [Cancelled Games]
|Greg
|November 14, 2017
|-
!40
|Game Updated to Mock its Own Sequel [Games Their Creators Hated]
|Greg
|November 16, 2017
|-
!41
|Important Announcement
|Dazz & Greg
|November 21, 2017
|-
!42
|Nintendo's Milking Contest [Weird Marketing Stunts]
|Dazz
|November 23, 2017
|-
!43
|Mario Kart Wii's Lost Mission Mode [Leftover Game Data]
|Greg
|November 29, 2017
|-
!44
|Gamers Outdo Scientists [Science and Video Games]
|Greg
|December 6, 2017
|-
!45
|Zelda Music Used at Olympics [Video Game Music Facts]
|Dazz
|December 14, 2017
|-
!46
|Spider-Man's Censored Kiss [Movie Video Game Facts]
|Dazz
|December 20, 2017
|-
!47
|Nintendo's Official "Bootleg" [Weird Nintendo Games]
|Greg
|December 27, 2017
|-
!48
|[Peter] Molyneux's Career Started With a Lie [Dishonesty in Gaming]
|Greg
|January 10, 2018
|-
!49
|Mario Almost Wasn't SNES Mascot [Video Game U-Turns]
|Dazz
|January 17, 2018
|-
!50
|Portal's Altered Ending [Changed Endings]
|Greg
|January 24, 2018
|-
!51
|Nintendo Labo Almost Thrown Out [Ratings Board Facts]
|Dazz
|February 1, 2018
|-
!52
|Bionic Commando Original Called “The Resurrection of Hitler"
|Greg
|February 7, 2018
|-
!53
|Kingdom Heart[s 2]'s Censored Spanking Scene [Region Differences]
|Greg
|February 14, 2018
|-
!54
|Sega Dreamcast Service That Never Was [Failed Hardware]
|Dazz
|February 21, 2018
|-
!55
|Sonic R's Religious Easter Egg
|Greg
|February 28, 2018
|-
!56
|Bootleg Games
|Red Bard
|March 7, 2018
|-
!57
|Resident Evil 2's GBA Tech Demo
|Dazz
|March 14, 2018
|-
!58
|Spyro's Cancelled MMORPG [Cancelled MMOs]
|Greg
|March 21, 2018
|-
!59
|Metal Gear's Rude Passwords
|Dazz
|March 28, 2018
|-
!60
|China Video Game Ban (Sonic, Mario, Zelda & More)
|Greg
|April 4, 2018
|-
!61
|GTA 5 Teaches Self-Driving Cars [AI & Games]
|Dazz
|April 11, 2018
|-
!62
|Mario's Lost Comic [Video Game Comics]
|Greg
|April 18, 2018
|-
!63
|How Blind Gamers Changed Madden [Gaming Accessibility]
|Dazz
|April 25, 2018
|-
!64
|EA Staged Fake Backlash [Failed Marketing Stunts]
|Greg
|May 3, 2018
|-
!65
|The Queen's Gold Nintendo Wii [Expensive Hardware]
|Dazz
|May 10, 2018
|-
!66
|Video Game Cheating Illegal in South Korea [Cheaters in Games]
|Greg
|May 16, 2018
|-
!67
|Failed Gaming Kickstarters
|Slopes Game Room
|May 26, 2018
|-
!68
|PC Game Constantly Updated For 25 Years [Dedicated Developers]
|Dazz
|May 30, 2018
|-
!69
|Snorlax Based on Real Person [Real Inspirations]
|Greg
|June 6, 2018
|-
!70
|Resident Evil 4 Easter Egg Found 12 Years Later [Late Discoveries]
|Dazz
|June 13, 2018
|-
!71
|Dreamcast Developer Helps Pirates [Game Piracy]
|Dazz
|June 26, 2018
|-
!72
|Video Game Chip Art [Hardware Easter Eggs]
|Greg
|June 28, 2018
|-
!73
|Sonic Mania's Hidden Tribute [Game Commemorations]
|Dazz
|July 5, 2018
|-
!74
|South Park Referenced in Japan-Only RPG [TV Easter Eggs]
|Greg
|July 11, 2018
|-
!75
|SpongeBob Game's Gross Secret [Crude Easter Eggs]
|Dazz
|July 18, 2018
|-
!76
|Nintendo & SEGA's Risque Ads [Video Game Ads]
|JaboodyDubs
|August 1, 2018
|-
!77
|NES Classic Edition's Secret Message [Hidden Messages]
|Mr. Weebl
|August 8, 2018
|-
!78
|Games Beat Depression & Anxiety [Games in Medicine]
|Boogie2988
|August 16, 2018
|-
!79
|Marriage Proposals in Games
|NakeyJakey
|August 22, 2018
|-
!80
|Kingdom Hearts' Source Code Lost Forever [Lost Data]
|Greg
|September 5, 2018
|-
!81
|Splatoon's Nod to Tupac & Biggie [Nintendo Easter Eggs]
|Dazz
|September 14, 2018
|-
!82
|Anno Games [Ubisoft's RTS Series]
|Greg
|September 18, 2018
|-
!83
|Man Sues Nintendo for Mistreatment [Nintendo Lawsuits]
|Dazz
|September 20, 2018
|-
!84
|Fallout 4's Phone Easter Egg [Video Games Phone Numbers]
|Greg
|September 29, 2018
|-
!85
|Childish Gambino Uses Donkey Kong Country Music [Video Game Samples]
|Greg
|October 6, 2018
|-
!86
|Sony Tries to Make Emulators Illegal [PlayStation Lawsuits]
|Dazz
|October 10, 2018
|-
!87
|Misleading Game Boxes [Lies in Video Games]
|Greg
|October 16, 2018
|-
!88
|Nintendo's Unreleased VR Console [Cancelled Hardware]
|Dazz
|October 28, 2018
|-
!89
|Spooky Secrets in Games [Halloween Horror Special]
|John Robertson
|October 31, 2018
|-
!90
|Spyro's Weird Link to Silent Hill [Music Facts]
|Greg
|November 7, 2018
|-
!91
|The Rock's Cancelled Video Game Movie [Gaming Movies]
|Dazz
|November 14, 2018
|-
!92
|Weird Banned Words in Games [Censored Games]
|Greg
|November 21, 2018
|-
!93
|Pokémon Yellow's Safari Zone Secret [Nintendo Game Updates]
|Dazz
|November 29, 2018
|-
!94
|Nintendo Easter Eggs
|Dazz
|December 4, 2018
|-
!95
|Metroid Prime 2 Producer Can't Beat His Own Game [Developer Stories]
|Dazz
|December 6, 2018
|-
!96
|Sega Genesis Games Facts
|Greg
|December 18, 2018
|-
!97
|Anti-Piracy Measures in Video Games
|Greg
|December 20, 2018
|-
!98
|Christmas Games Facts
|Dazz
|December 25, 2018
|-
!99
|GameCube Game Facts
|Greg
|January 9, 2019
|-
!100
|Nintendo Switch Games Facts
|Dazz
|January 23, 2019
|-
!101
|PlayStation 2 Games Facts
|Greg
|February 6, 2019
|-
!102
|Game Boy Advance Games Facts
|Greg
|February 20, 2019
|-
!103
|The Nintendo Truck Heist [Gaming Heists]
|Dazz
|February 27, 2019
|-
!104
|Xbox Games Facts
|Greg
|March 6, 2019
|-
!105
|SNES Games Facts
|Greg
|March 21, 2019
|-
!106
|References to Memes in Gaming
|Greg
|March 23, 2019
|-
!107
|Nintendo 3DS Games Facts
|Dazz
|April 24, 2019
|-
!108
|PlayStation 1 Game Facts
|Caddicarus
|May 1, 2019
|-
!109
|Nintendo 64 Games Facts [OLD]
|Greg
|May 10, 2019
|-
!110
|Game Boy Games Facts
|Dazz
|May 23, 2019
|-
!111
|More Memes in Video Games
|Greg
|June 4, 2019
|-
!112
|Dreamcast Games Facts
|Dazz
|June 15, 2019
|-
!113
|Amiga Games Trivia
|Ashens
|June 26, 2019
|-
!114
|PS4 Games Facts
|Greg
|July 10, 2019
|-
!115
|NES Games Facts
|Greg
|July 18, 2019
|-
!116
|Xbox 360 Games Facts
|Dazz
|August 4, 2019
|-
!117
|Sega Master System Games Trivia
|Nostalgia Nerd
|August 25, 2019
|-
!118
|Anime Games Facts
|Greg
|August 28, 2019
|-
!119
|PlayStation 3 Games Facts
|Dazz
|September 5, 2019
|-
!120
|Wii U Games Facts
|Greg
|September 11, 2019
|-
!121
|PSP Games Facts
|Greg
|September 30, 2019
|-
!122
|Nintendo Wii Games Facts [OLD]
|Greg
|October 18, 2019
|-
!123
|SEGA Genesis Games Facts
|Dazz
|October 23, 2019
|-
!124
|Xbox One Games Facts
|Dazz
|November 13, 2019
|-
!125
|The Pokémon Mini: Nintendo's Failed Console
|Dazz
|November 18, 2019
|-
!126
|Nintendo Switch Games
|Greg
|December 4, 2019
|-
!127
|PC Games Facts [OLD]
|Greg
|December 20, 2019
|-
!128
|N64 Games Facts
|Dazz
|December 31, 2019
|-
!129
|Nintendo DS Games Facts
|Greg
|January 5, 2020
|-
!130
|Video Game Music Facts
|Dazz
|January 31, 2020
|-
!131
|Arcade Games Facts
|Greg
|February 6, 2020
|-
!132
|GameCube Games Facts
|Greg
|February 24, 2020
|-
!133
|Memes in Video Games (BotW, Witcher 3, Fallout 76 + More)
|Dazz
|March 12, 2020
|-
!134
|Resident Evil Easter Eggs
|Dazz
|March 21, 2020
|-
!135
|Animal Crossing Easter Eggs
|Greg
|March 29, 2020
|-
!136
|Obscure Mario Games
|Greg
|April 4, 2020
|-
!137
|Fighting Games Facts
|Dazz
|April 12, 2020
|-
!138
|Obscure Sonic Games
|Greg
|April 27, 2020
|-
!139
|Cartoon and Anime Games Facts
|Greg
|May 23, 2020
|-
!140
|Zelda Plagiarism
|Greg
|July 22, 2020
|-
!141
|Nintendo DS Game Censorship
|Dazz
|July 31, 2020
|-
!142
|Super Mario Plagiarism
|Greg
|August 15, 2020
|-
!143
|Flash Game Facts
|Dazz
|September 15, 2020
|-
!144
|Nintendo Controversies
|Greg
|October 14, 2020
|-
!145
|Halloween Special
|Dazz 
|October 28, 2020
|-
!146
|Nintendo's Amazing Tech Demo
|Dazz 
|December 7, 2020
|-
!147
|Stolen Artwork
|Greg
|December 12, 2020
|-
!148
|Switch Games Facts
|Dazz
|December 15, 2020
|-
!149
|Pokémon Plagiarism
|Greg
|December 24, 2020
|-
!150
|Nintendo GameCube Games [OLD]
|Greg
|February 13, 2021
|-
!151
|Bootleg Super Mario Games
|rabbidluigi
|February 27, 2021
|-
!152
|Indie Games Facts
|Greg
|March 17, 2021
|-
!153
|Sega Saturn Games Facts (Sonic, Symphony of the Night + more)
|Ashens
|April 6, 2021
|-
!154
|PlayStation Vita Games Facts
|Dazz
|April 17, 2021
|-
!155
|Game Boy Advance (GBA) Games Facts
|Greg
|June 5, 2021
|-
!156
|Nintendo 64 Games Facts
|Dazz
|June 26, 2021
|-
!157
|Nintendo 3DS Game Facts
|Dazz
|July 10, 2021
|-
!158
|Anti-Piracy Measures in PC Games
|Greg
|July 31, 2021
|-
!159
|PS2 Game Facts (PlayStation 2)
|Greg
|August 14, 2021
|-
!160
|SNES Game Facts (Super Nintendo)
|Dazz
|August 28, 2021
|-
!161
|Nintendo Wii Game Facts
|Greg
|September 9, 2021
|-
!162
|Nintendo DS Game Facts
|Greg
|September 18, 2021
|-
!163
|GameCube Game Facts (Nintendo)
|Greg
|October 9, 2021
|-
!164
|Memes in Video Games (Pokémon, SpongeBob Battle for Bikini Bottom + More)
|Dazz
|October 31, 2021
|-
!165
|Game Boy Game Facts  Pokémon, Super Mario, Wario, Kirby + More
|Greg
|November 11, 2021
|-
!166
|Anti-Piracy in Nintendo 64 Games  Zelda, Banjo, DK64 + more (N64)
|Greg
|November 19, 2021
|-
!167
|PS1 Game Facts  Crash Bandicoot, RE2, Rugrats, FF9 + more
|Greg
|December 18, 2021
|-
!168
|Nintendo Switch Game Facts  Pokémon BDSP, Metroid Dread + More
|Dazz
|January 12, 2022
|-
!169
|Glitches in GameCube Games // Mario, Zelda, Melee + more
|Greg
|January 19, 2022
|-
!170
|Game Boy Advance Game Facts // Pokémon, Metroid + more (GBA)
|Dazz
|January 26, 2022
|-
!171
|Anti-Cheat Punishments in PC Games
|Greg
|February 2, 2022
|-
!172
|Nintendo 64 Game Facts (N64)
|Dazz
|February 9, 2022
|-
!173
|Anti-Piracy in Nintendo DS Games  Pokémon, Dragon Quest + more (NDS)
|Greg
|February 17, 2022
|-
!174
|PS2 Game Facts  FFX, GTA San Andreas, Tony Hawk's + more (PlayStation 2)
|Dazz
|February 23, 2022
|-
!175
|Mistakes in Game Boy Avance Games (GBA)
|Greg
|March 2, 2022
|-
!176
|Super Nintendo (SNES) Game Facts
|Dazz
|March 9, 2022
|-
!177
|Regional Differences in Switch Games (Nintendo Switch)
|Greg
|March 16, 2022
|-
!178
|PC Game Facts
|Dazz
|March 23, 2022
|-
!179
|Anti-Cheat Measures in Nintendo 64 (N64) Games
|Dazz
|March 31, 2022
|-
!180
|NES Game Facts | Mario, Zelda, Kirby & more
|Greg
|April 14, 2022
|-
!181
|PS1 Games | MGS, FF7, Crash Bandicoot + more
|Dazz
|April 20, 2022
|-
!182
|Nintendo DS Games
|Greg
|April 27, 2022
|-
!183
|Super Nintendo (SNES) Games
|Greg
|May 5, 2022
|-
!184
|Nintendo GameBoy Game Facts
|Greg
|May 12, 2022
|-
!185
|Game Boy Advance (GBA) Games
|Dazz
|May 19, 2022
|-
!186
|Nintendo Wii Games
|Greg
|May 26, 2022
|-
!187
|Nintendo 64 (N64) Game Facts
|Dazz
|June 16, 2022
|-
!188
|How Memes Get Into Video Games
|Dazz
|July 21, 2022
|-
!189
|Super Mario Sunshine Trick Took 15 Years to Find + More GCN Facts
|Dazz and Greg
|August 14, 2022
|}

VGFacts

Region Locked
In Region Locked, they talk about games that didn't get an international release or did not get a release in all regions.

Region Locked Light 
Region Locked Light was originally a spin-off of Region Locked. On November 21, 2017, they announced that Region Locked Light would be cancelled to focus on more, bigger Region Locked episodes.

Unseen64

Unseen64 was a video series which covered canceled and unreleased video games made in association with canceled game archive Unseen64.net. The series was produced by Liam Robertson, an editor from the site.

Game History Secrets 

Game History Secrets is a video series covering obscure stories from video game history, such as canceled video games and unseen game pitches. The series is produced by game journalist Liam Robertson.

Reception
The site has received generally positive reception from critics.

CEO of Destructoid, Hamza Aziz, has praised the site saying "The Did You Know Gaming series is a pretty wonderful look at the lesser known facts of your favorite videogames."

Steve Napierski, author of the webcomic series Dueling Analogs, has posted about Did You Know Gaming? multiple times saying that "Not sure if you've noticed from the amount of Did You Know Gaming? videos I have reposted on Dueling Analogs, but I am definitely a fan of them."

References

External links
Official site

Internet properties established in 2012
Video game blogs
Gaming-related YouTube channels
2010s YouTube series
Gaming YouTubers
2020s YouTube series
YouTube channels launched in 2012